Pandalam Sudhakaran (born 22 November 1955, in Pandalam, Kerala, India) is an Indian politician 
belongs to Indian National Congress party. He became elected to the Kerala Legislative Assembly for the first time in 1982 as Congress party candidate from Wandoor Constituency. He got elected again in 1982, '87 and '91 from the same constituency.

Political positions held

1978–1982 Kerala Students Union Vice President, General Secretary
1982–1989 Youth Congress Vice President, General Secretary
1982–1996 Member, Kerala Legislative Assembly (Wandoor)
1989–1992 Youth Congress State President
1987–1991 Whip, Congress Legislative Party
1991–1996 Minister for Scheduled castes and scheduled tribes, Sports and Youth Affairs, CADA in K. Karunakaran Govt
1995–1996 Minister Excise and Sc/ST, Backward Community in A K Antony Govt

He was a member of the Gandhiji University Syndicate, Calicut University Senate, Kerala Pradesh Congress Committee (KPCC) executive,  AICC, Trivandrum Doordarshan Kendra Advisory Board. He was a Jury member of Kerala state film award committee. He was director of Kerala State Film Development Corporation. KPCC General Secretary, Chairman Kerala Tourism Development Corporation (KTDC), Director of JaiHind TV, and Vice Chairman of the Malayalam Cine technicians Association (MACTA), Executive Board Member of Kerala Kalamandalam, Spokesman of KPCC (from 2013 onwards)

References

www.thehindu.com
www.stateofkerala.in 
Pandalam Sudhakran website
Images from The Hindu

1955 births
Politicians from Thiruvananthapuram
Living people
Indian National Congress politicians from Kerala
People from Pathanamthitta
Malayalam-language lyricists
Kerala MLAs 1982–1987
Kerala MLAs 1987–1991
Kerala MLAs 1991–1996